Hilary Rose may refer to:

 Hilary Rose (actress) Irish actress and writer
 Hilary Rose (field hockey) (born 1971), British field hockey goalkeeper
 Hilary Rose (sociologist) (born 1935), British feminist; professor of sociology and social policy; author on science policy.